Gerry Williams (1926 – 2014) was an American artist. He was a ceramist and a co-founder of Studio Potter magazine.

Biography 
He was born Frederick Gerald Williams in Asansol, Bengal, India, in 1926, during the era of the British Raj. His parents were American missionaries in Bengal, working at a school. 

He attended Woodstock School in Mussoorie in Uttarakhand from 1937 until 1942. He returned to the United States and he attended Cornell College in Iowa. He was a conscientious objector during World War II and missed several years of college due to the war. In the 1940s, Williams discovered pottery while living in Maine.

In 1949, Williams moved to Concord, New Hampshire, and started his own pottery business. In the early 1950s he took ceramic classes at the League of New Hampshire Craftsmen. In 1953 he built his own studio and home in Dunbarton, New Hampshire, where he remained for many years with his wife Julie. In 1972, Williams founded Studio Potter magazine with Julie.

Gerry Williams died on August 25, 2014, in New Hampshire from Parkinson's disease. His work is included in various public museum collections, including at the Museum of Fine Arts, Boston, the Currier Museum of Art, the Museum of Contemporary Crafts, the Fleming Museum of Art, and others.

References 

1926 births
2014 deaths
American ceramists
Cornell College alumni
People from Dunbarton, New Hampshire
Neurological disease deaths in New Hampshire
Deaths from Parkinson's disease
American conscientious objectors
People from Asansol
American magazine publishers (people)